Nancy Schön (born 1928) is a sculptor of public art displayed internationally. She is best known for her work in the Boston, Massachusetts area, notably her bronze duck and ducklings in the Boston Public Garden, a recreation of the duck family in Robert McCloskey's children's classic Make Way for Ducklings. It is featured on the Boston Women's Heritage Trail. In 1991, Barbara Bush gave a duplicate of this sculpture to Raisa Gorbachev as part of the START Treaty, and the work is displayed in Moscow's Novodevichy Park.

In 1952, after graduation from Boston's Museum School, she married Donald Alan Schön (1930–1997), and her series, The Reflective Giraffe, with a giraffe as the central icon, is a tribute to her husband. Since 1966, she has lived in West Newton, Massachusetts.

In 2009, Nancy Schön was a participant at "Engaging Reflection," a Canadian seminar, which offered this profile of her:
Nancy prides herself in having work that is totally interactive.  Her sculptures are available for people to touch, sit on, hug and interact with every day of the year, day or night. Nancy Schön’s major works include Make Way for Ducklings which is located in the Boston Public Garden in Boston, Massachusetts and the Tortoise and Hare which is a metaphor for the Boston Marathon and is at the finish line in Copley Square. Nancy married Donald Schön in 1952 and feels their work was very similar. Donald’s writing about  “reflection in action” parallels the process of creating a sculpture as the professional reflects on their practice in the midst of practice in order to problem solve. As Nancy creates a work of art, her research is a quest for knowledge and of understanding issues and of learning. “We learn so much from our inquiry but as my husband said, ‘we know more than we can say’ and I would always say back to him that I think our unconscious is brilliant!” Nancy was recently awarded an honorary doctor of law degree from Mount Ida College in honor of her work in public sculpture.

Gallery

References

External links
About Nancy Schön
Winnie the Pooh and Eeyore sculptures by Nancy Schon at the Newton Free Library in Newton, Massachusetts

1928 births
Living people
American sculptors
School of the Museum of Fine Arts at Tufts alumni